Rose of the Mountain is a 1952 West German musical comedy film directed by Hubert Marischka and starring Marte Harell, Grethe Weiser and Waltraut Haas. It takes its German title from a popular 1947 song of the same name, which is used in the film as a melody. It was shot at the Spandau Studios in West Berlin and on location in Carinthia at the Hotel Karawankenblick in Pörtschach and around the lake of Wörthersee. The film's sets were designed by the art directors Willi Herrmann and Heinrich Weidemann.

Synopsis
The Austrian-born dancer Kate Smith and the composer Jack Long meet while working on Broadway. Both are homesick and decide to return home. They go to stay at the country hotel run by Kate's sister Rose. However it turns out that Jack and Rose are old flames.

Cast
 Marte Harell as Rose Karnigg, Besitzerin Hotel 'Karawankenblick'
 Grethe Weiser as Hannelore Reichmeister, Kurgast aus Berlin
 Waltraut Haas as Kate Smith
 Hans Moser as Ferdinand Schmiedlehner, Finanzbeamter i.P.
 Curd Jürgens as Composer Jack Long
 Oskar Sima as Metzgermeister Leopold Führinger
 Franz Marischka as Thomas Führinger, sein Sohn
 Ludwig Schmitz as Jühlich
 Lotte Rausch
 Friedel Hardt

References

Bibliography 
Robert von Dassanowsky & Oliver C. Speck. New Austrian Film. Berghahn Books, 2011.

External links 
 

1952 films
1952 musical comedy films
German musical comedy films
West German films
1950s German-language films
Films directed by Hubert Marischka
Films scored by Hans Lang
Constantin Film films
Films shot at Spandau Studios
German black-and-white films
1950s German films